Ben Sowden (born 23 January 1983, in Leeds, England) is an actor, writer and musician who first appeared as Thomas in Children's Ward (1989 and 1991) and John Reed in Jane Eyre (1997).

In July 2018 he released Left of Arc, a solo album of acoustic folk-punk music and a Christmas single in aid of the Trussell Trust in late 2019. In December 2020 he released No Filter Sky, an Americana-influenced EP recorded during lockdown, with a follow up album due in 2021.

As a writer he is a frequent contributor to satirical publications and in 2020 joined the cast of acclaimed online soap The Tories voicing British political figures including Jacob Rees-Mogg, Thérèse Coffey and John Redwood.

He lives with his wife and children in Buckinghamshire.

References

1983 births
English male child actors
Living people
English male television actors